The River Subdivision is a railroad line owned by CSX Transportation in the U.S. states of New Jersey and New York. The line runs from the North Bergen Yard in Hudson County, New Jersey north to Ravena, New York, along the alignment of the West Shore Railroad, a former New York Central Railroad line.

History
The original line was opened in segments by a number of different companies from the 1860s to the opening of the full line in 1883, by which time it was known as the New York, West Shore and Buffalo Railway. Through mergers, leases and takeovers, it became part of the New York Central Railroad; later Penn Central and then Conrail, in 1976. When the majority of Conrail was broken up in 1999, its River Line was assigned to CSX Transportation.

Current operation

The River Subdivision (also known as the River Sub or River SD) is a major north–south rail corridor located between North Bergen, New Jersey and Ravena, New York, carries strictly freight trains and runs mostly along the shoreline or paralleling closely the west bank of the Hudson River. The River Subdivision is part of the CSX Albany Division, which in turn is part of CSX's Northern Region of Operations.

The CSX designated subdivision code for the River Subdivision is "RI", with the River Subdivision falling under the "NI" dispatchers desk since March 8, 2009. It had been part of the "NJ" dispatchers desk until this date. Mileposts and locations along the River Subdivision are denoted by the CSX milepost prefix: "QR".

Trackage prior to 2008 
Note: CP stands for Control Point, which denotes an interlocking, or the location of a track signal or other marker with which dispatchers can specify when controlling trains.

Prior to July 1, 2008, the section of track from QR 2.1 north to CP-QR 7, a point located in Bogota, New Jersey, was originally part of the CSX Bergen Subdivision / Baltimore Division prior to 2008, while the River Subdivision began at CP-QR 7 and continued north to Selkirk. 
   
On July 1, 2008 (the effective date of CSX Albany Division Employees Timetable "ETT" #5), the segment from QR 2.1 to CP-QR 7 (which comprised the entire Bergen Subdivision); was incorporated into the River Subdivision, and the Bergen Subdivision was abolished. Also taking place at this same time, was the River Subdivision being extended south to QR 1.6, adding 5/10th of a mile to the route.

Trackage 2000–present 
The section of track south of QR 1.6 at the south end of North Bergen Yard is now owned by Conrail Shared Assets Operation (CSAO) and is part of the North New Jersey Operational Area River Line. As such, the River Subdivision now connects directly to the River Line at MP QR 1.6 and the first "Controlled Point" on the River Subdivision is now CP-QR 3.

Points of interest

Major points of interest along the River Subdivision route are listed below. MP is the abbreviation for MilePost. Mileposts progress numerically from south to north. These points are of major interest to railfans and rail photographers.

MP QR 1.6 - southernmost point of River Subdivision (North Bergen Yard
MP QR 3.0 - Little Ferry Yard
................-  Overpeck Creek
MP QR 5.0 - Ridgefield Park Station
MP QR 7.2 - Bogota defect detector
MP QR 18.8 - New Jersey / New York State Border
MP QR 20.5 - Orangeburg defect detector
MP QR 24.5 - Nyack
MP QR 28.5 - Congers Station Park
MP QR 30.0 - Haverstraw Tunnel
MP QR 33.4 - West Haverstraw Yard
MP QR 38.5 - Stony Point defect detector and Twin Anchors Memorial
MP QR 41.0 - Iona Island (a public and popular raifanning location)
MP QR 41.5 - Iona Island Trestle
MP QR 42.3 - Bear Mountain Bridge
MP QR 42.5 - Popolopen Creek Trestle
MP QR 42.7 - Fort Montgomery Tunnel
MP QR 42.9 - Mine Dock Park (a public and popular railfanning location opened 2012)
MP QR 47.3 - West Point Tunnel
MP QR 51.0 - Storm King Mountain
MP QR 52.0 - Cornwall Landing Park (a public railfanning location)
MP QR 53.0 - Junction with the defunct NYO&W Railroad (site is marked by a marble obelisk just off the adjacent road, in the woods), abandoned on March 30, 1957
MP QR 56.5 - Newburgh Waterfront
MP QR 61.0 - Roseton defect detector
MP QR 68.0 - Milton Station (a public and popular railfanning location w/ river pier for from-the-water railfanning views)
MP QR 72.0 - Walkway Over The Hudson State Park (aerial views of the River Sub with exceptional views in the north direction)
MP QR 72.3 - Highland Landing Park (a public railfanning location)
MP QR 78.1 - West Park (a public and popular railfanning location)
MP QR 84.4 - Hercules defect detector
MP QR 86.4 - Wilbur Trestle (best viewed from the Old Rt. 9W suspension bridge, 1/2 mile east)
MP QR 86.8 - Kingston Tunnel
MP QR 88.8 - Kingston Yard
MP QR 92.3 - Glenerie Falls Trestle
MP QR 99.1 - Saugerties defect detector
MP QR 102.1 - West Camp S-Curve (a popular railfanning spot on Rt. 9w)
MP QR 104.8 - Alsen Yard
MP QR 108.1 - Catskill defect detector
MP QR 110.2 - Catskill Trestle
MP QR 114.9 - Athens defect detector
MP QR 123.8 - Ravena Curve (a popular railfanning location on  Rt. 9w)
MP QR 128.5 - Ravena defect detector
MP QR 132.6 - CP-SK / Selkirk: northernmost point of River Subdivision, turns west and merges into Castleton Subdivision and Selkirk Yard.

At Selkirk, New York, the River Subdivision ends at "CP-SK" (MP QR 132.6) where it curves west and merges into the Castleton Subdivision, and of which this location is the extreme eastern end of Selkirk Yard.

Also at this point CP-SK, the Port Subdivision branches north towards Albany off the Castleton Subdivision (but is not directly accessible by the River Subdivision). The Port Subdivision ends 7 miles north of CP-SK in South Albany, NY at the Kenwood Yard of the Canadian Pacific Railway.

Also at CP-SK, an eastbound connector from the River Subdivision is available for trains to progress east onto the Castleton Subdivision and over the Hudson River (to points east, via the CSX Berkshire & Boston Subdivisions). The Castleton Sub was originally built as part of a bypass for through trains around Albany that opened in 1924.

The configuration of the track work at CP-SK between the River Subdivision, Castleton Subdivision including the "east wye track", form a triangle: a "wye" in railroad parlance; on which locomotives can be turned if need be.

Radio frequencies
Radio transmissions between trains and dispatcher operating upon the CSX River Subdivision is assigned to the CSX 'NI' Dispatcher Desk, and can be heard on the following frequencies:

AAR Channel 58 - 160.980 - road
AAR Channel 34 - 160.620 - dispatcher to train

Also, if in close proximity to them, "Hot Box", High Wide "HIWI" or Defect Detectors can be heard relaying train info (speed, axle count, defects if any (hot boxes or dragging equipment) to the train on the aforementioned road channel.

Location - Milepost (FCC registration ID)
(from south to north)

- New Jersey - 
Bogota, NJ  - QR 7.2 (WNZQ483)
- New York -
Orangeburg, NY  - QR 20.5 (WNZQ483)
Stony Point - QR 38.5 (WNZQ483)
Roseton - QR 61.0 (WNZQ484)
Hercules - QR 84.4 (WNZQ484/WPGP396)
Saugerties - QR 99.1 (WPGP396)
Catskill - QR 108.1 (WPGP396)
Athens - QR 114.9 (WPGP396)
Ravena - QR 128.5 (WPPA263)

Freight traffic
Traffic on the River Subdivision consists mostly of long-distance trains composed of intermodal, TOFC (Trailer On Flat Car), unit and mixed commodity trains.
Traffic density varies, but on weekdays one can expect to see 15 to 20 trains during daylight hours. Saturdays can provide 18-24 trains during the day; Sundays may only have 8-14 trains.
One can expect to see 2-5 oil trains and 1-2 ethanol trains per day.(2015)

Local trains delivering freight to businesses and industries located along the River Subdivision operate out of yards located at North Bergen, NJ; Kingston, NY and Selkirk, NY.

Train symbols (prefixes) operating on this line are:
C - local
G - unit: grain (very rarely)
I - quality intermodal: I000 series UPS, I100 series intermodal.
K - unit: oil, ethanol
L - alternate schedule of a Q train
Q - quality: Q200 series auto carriers, Q300 east/west mixed commodity, Q400 north/south mixed commodity, and Q700 trash
S - second section
X - extra

On rare occasions, a Z prefix (foreign road train) may appear on this route: usually detour trains from the NYS&W.

A vast majority of the intermodal traffic originating in the various ports in New Jersey, and destined for Chicago, IL and points west from that rail hub, travel north via the River Subdivision to Selkirk, NY, where they turn west.

Bakken oil
The line is used for the transport of Bakken oil. The line uses rail cars that are considered inadequate and a safety hazard, calling for more regulations and oversight by the towns which The River Line passes through. In February 2016, competitive federal funding for rail improvements was not awarded to the line. Bridges used for traffic near the Port of Albany have not been satisfactorily inspected.

Future freight operations, proposals, and improvements

Plans have been proposed to add sidings and supersidings along portions of the River Subdivision, as rail traffic along this route has increased due to escalating fuel prices and deteriorating and / or congested arterial highways.

The original River line as constructed by the West Shore Railroad was double-track main; that is, one track assigned to southbound trains and one assigned to northbound trains. With the advent of Centralized Traffic Control a/k/a "CTC", the River line was reduced to single-track main with passing sidings at strategic locations.

Several recent proposals (ca. 2008) put forth plans to either install supersidings (multi-segment extended length sidings), permitting trains to pass one another at speed without stopping, or reverting to complete double-tracking from North Bergen to Selkirk.

As of 2008, the original signalled siding (ssdg) between CP-QR 76 (Highland) and CP-QR 78 (West Park) which was 12,500 feet in length, was extended to 24,000 feet with the extension of the original siding to another siding from CP-QR 78 (West Park) to CP-QR 80 (Esopus), with crossovers at CP-QR 78. This extension, known as "West Park Siding", makes the entire length from CP-QR 76 to CP-QR 80 a supersiding.

As learned from Ulster County Integrated Advance Train Detection and Arrival Prediction Implementation Plan, page 9 of this document shows one new siding and one supersiding are now proposed to further alleviate rail traffic congestion:

a new siding from QR 93 (Lake Katrine/Glenerie) to QR 96 (Mount Marion), and:
a new supersiding, which would extend the current existing siding from CP-QR 103 (West Camp) to CP-QR 106 (Alsen), with the extension reaching to CP-QR 110 (Catskill).
2015 Update:  Supersidings have now been completed between CP QR 125 in Ravena and CP QR 118 Coxsackie; CP QR 45.5 in Highland Falls and CP QR 43 in Fort Montgomery; and CP QR 38 in Stony Point and CP QR 33 in Haverstraw.

Should CSX decide to double-track the entire line, this could be accomplished with minimal difficulty, as the River Subdivision was originally double-track operation (when constructed by the New York, West Shore & Buffalo / New York Central Railroad). As the width of the right of way is already graded for double track, with bridges and trestles already in place that had been constructed as double track, only the re-installation of the second main tracks, turnouts and signals need to be installed.

One area of engineering slightly hinders this double tracking, yet it is not insurmountable as it has been done on other railroads and routes. Upon the installation of CTC, one of the two main line tracks was removed, and the remaining main line track was realigned down the center of the  some of the tunnels (e.g.: Kingston Tunnel). When use of double-stack container trains became prevalent, only the center portion of the tunnel roof or 'ceiling' directly over the track was raised to permit tall double stack intermodal / container trains to use that tunnel. The part of the ceiling where the roof meets the sidewall was not raised.

If double tracking is reinstated, the existing track down the center would need to be realigned to one side of the tunnel (to its original double track alignment) to permit the other track to be re-installed. This would now require either the entire width of the tunnel roof to be raised, or the full width of the roadbed lowered to permit double stack intermodal / container trains to use these tunnels.

New Jersey Transit commuter rail proposal

While the Northern Branch Corridor Project has proceeded to the EIS Stage, the West Shore Route is still proposed.

The route holds great promise since it travels through the heart of New Jersey Transit Bus Operations Midtown "commutershed", with four bus routes (165,167, 168 & 177) running well beyond capacity.

The right-of-way has space for four tracks from Croxton Yard northwards to Dumont. Issues in starting commuter rail service are:
CSX owns the trackage and uses them heavily to link the NYC area to their national network at Selkirk yard in upstate New York.
CSX offered to allow NJ Transit use of the ROW if the agency constructed sound barriers along the entire length of track for commuter operations.
A City Terminal is not connected to this line, since the Weehawken and Pavonia Terminals were demolished decades ago. A loop connecting this line with the North River Tunnels into New York Penn Station where the West Shore Tracks pass under the Northeast Corridor just south of NJ Route 3 and Tonnelle Ave would directly connect this line into New York Penn Station. This configuration would provide a 25-minute travel time to New York Penn Station, but would bypass Secaucus Junction, leaving the West Shore with no transfer connection to the rest of New Jersey other than a possible transfer station on Tonnelle Ave with the Hudson Bergen Light Rail.

With these considerable construction issues, as well as no available space in New York Penn Station for West Shore Line trains, this proposal was put on hold until capacity into New York is increased (with the completion of the proposed Gateway Tunnel).

See also
West Shore Railroad
National Docks Secondary
List of CSX Transportation lines

References

External links
 Trains carrying crude oil concern in North Jersey

CSX Transportation lines
Rail infrastructure in New Jersey
Rail infrastructure in New York (state)
New York Central Railroad lines